Joni Liljeblad (born 17 September 1989) is a Finnish professional ice hockey player who played with Kärpät in the SM-liiga during the 2010-11 season.

References

External links

1989 births
Living people
Finnish ice hockey defencemen
Oulun Kärpät players
Sportspeople from Oulu